The 1950 Western Kentucky Hilltoppers football team represented Western Kentucky State College (now known as Western Kentucky University) as a member of the Ohio Valley Conference (OVC) during the 1950 college football season. Led by third-year head coach Jack Clayton, the Hilltoppers compiled an overall record of 6–2–2 with a mark of 3–1–2 in conference play, placing second in the OVC. The team's captains were Roy Hina and Joe Talley.

Schedule

References

Western Kentucky
Western Kentucky Hilltoppers football seasons
Western Kentucky Hilltoppers football